The American Cordillera is a chain of mountain ranges (cordilleras) that consists of an almost continuous sequence of mountain ranges that form the western "backbone" of the Americas. With Aconcagua as the highest peak of the chain. It is also the backbone of the volcanic arc that forms the eastern half of the Pacific Ring of Fire.

Description

North America

The ranges of the Cordillera from Mexico northward are collectively called the North American Cordillera.

From north to south, this sequence of overlapping and parallel ranges begins with the Alaska Range and the Brooks Range in Alaska and runs through the Yukon into British Columbia. The main belt of the Rocky Mountains along with the parallel Columbia Mountains and Coast Ranges of mountains and islands continue through British Columbia and Vancouver Island. In the United States, the Cordillera branches include the Rockies, the Sierra Nevada, the Cascades, and various small Pacific coastal ranges. In Mexico, the Cordillera continues through the Sierra Madre Occidental and Sierra Madre Oriental, as well as the backbone mountains of the Baja California peninsula.

The Cordillera continues on through the mountain ranges of Central America in Guatemala, Honduras, Nicaragua, Costa Rica, and Panama, and becomes the Andes Mountains of South America.

South America and Antarctica
The Cordillera, having continued through Central America, continues through South America and even to the Antarctic.  In South America, the Cordillera is known as the Andes Mountains.  The Andes with their parallel chains and the island chains off the coast of Chile continue through Colombia, Venezuela, Ecuador, Peru, Bolivia, Argentina, and Chile to the southernmost tip of South America at Tierra del Fuego. The Cordillera continues along the Scotia Arc before reaching the mountains of the Antarctic Peninsula.

References

Further reading
Silberling, N.J. et al. (1992). Lithotectonic terrane map of the North American Cordillera [Miscellaneous Investigations Series I-2176]. Reston, Va.:  U.S. Department of the Interior, U.S. Geological Survey.

Americas
Mountain ranges
Mountain ranges of North America
Mountain ranges of Central America
Mountain ranges of South America
Mountain ranges of Antarctica
North American Cordillera